Deputy commandant is a Group-A gazetted officer rank in the Central Armed Police Forces (CAPF) and Indian Coast Guard. This rank is equivalent to the rank of Superintendent of police (India) and In the Indian Armed Forces it is a title given to the officer in charge or chief instructor of a military (or other uniformed service) training establishment or academy. This usage is common in English-speaking nations.

Deputy Commandant (DC) in CAPF

Deputy Commandant in CAPF has varied job profile. They are either posted as Adjutant of the battalion or command service companies. Deputy Commandants who have completed their staff courses are also posted as "staff officer" to senior officers at sector and frontier HQs. If a Deputy Commandant is posted as a head of a unit, then he/she will discharge all the duties of a Commandant and will exercise only those financial powers that are delegated to him under the relevant rules.

Comparative Ranks To Deputy Commandant (DC) In CAPF

Promotional Avenues for Gazetted Officers in CAPF 
After joining the service as Assistant commandant and completing 5 years of service successfully the next promotion is to the rank of Deputy commandant.

Pay Scale of Deputy commandant CAPF
The basic pay of deputy commandant is INR 67,700 falls under Pay Band 3.

See also
 Border Security Force
 Central Industrial Security Force
 Central Reserve Police Force
 Indo-Tibetan Border Police
 Sashastra Seema Bal

References

Central Armed Police Forces of India